Solstice/Sound and Shadows  is an album by American guitarist Ralph Towner that was released on the ECM label in 1977. It is the second album to feature the Solstice quartet of Towner with Jan Garbarek, Eberhard Weber and Jon Christensen.

Reception
Allmusic awarded the album with 4 stars and its review by Michael G. Nastos states: "The playing here by Towner and a group of other ECM artists is what made the label so noteworthy: it is full of elegance and aplomb and the musicians are as aware of space as they are of what fills it".

Track listing

Personnel
Ralph Towner – 12-string and classical guitar, piano, French horn
Jan Garbarek – tenor and soprano saxophone, flute
Eberhard Weber – bass, cello
Jon Christensen – drums, percussion

References

1977 albums
ECM Records albums
Ralph Towner albums
Albums produced by Manfred Eicher